Astralarctia pulverosa is a moth of the family Erebidae first described by William Schaus in 1905. It is found in French Guiana, Suriname, Guyana, Amazonas, Peru and Bolivia.

References

Phaegopterina
Moths described in 1905
Moths of South America